Máfia do Apito (literally The Whistle Mafia), sometimes referred to as the Escândalo do Apito (The Whistle Scandal), was the name given by the Brazilian press to the football match-fixing scandal reported by Veja magazine on 23 September 2005.

Overview 

Some investors, who were not related to any club, bribed referees Edílson Pereira de Carvalho (a member of the FIFA referee staff) and Paulo José Danelon to fix results according to what was determined by the betting websites Aebet and Futbet. The investors made a deal with Edílson Pereira de Carvalho to fix the results of the matches refereed by him, and then, the investors made millionaire bets on the betting websites. Edílson Pereira de Carvalho said that he agreed to receive R$10,000 (US$4,400) to fix the result of the Brazilian National Championship match between Juventude and Figueirense, and that he was paid between R$10,000 and R$15,000 per fixed match. Edílson Pereira de Carvalho said he accepted the money to fix the results only because he had a R$30,000 debt.

The eleven Brazilian National Championship matches refereed by Edílson Pereira de Carvalho was made null and void by the Supreme Court of Sporting Justice (STJD), presided by Luiz Zveiter, even though Edílson Pereira de Carvalho assured he did not fix all eleven matches. The Supreme Court decided that all eleven matches needed to be replayed. This decision was not popular among the board of directors and supporters of the harmed clubs. Five clubs, which are Ponte Preta, Santos, Internacional, Figueirense and Cruzeiro appealed the decision, but the decision was kept.

On 28 November, Brazilian lawyer Luís Carlos Crema sought a court injunction requesting the cancellation of the decision that annulled the eleven Brazilian National Championship matches, Minister Nancy Andrighi of the Second Section of the Supreme Court of Justice rejected the demand.

However, another lawyer, Leandro Konrad Konflanz sought a lawsuit requesting the annulment of the replayed matches. If those matches are annulled, Internacional would win the competition, instead of Corinthians. The decision was that no club should be announced as champion during the dawn of Sunday, 5 December. CBF, ignoring the decision, on 6 December, declared Corinthians as the 2005 Campeonato Brasileiro champion. Judge Munira Hanna, of the First Civil Court of Porto Alegre, dispatched a temporary restraining order obligating the CBF to obey that decision. However, FIFA and CBF rules forbid clubs to petition regular courts of justice (courts that are not dedicated to sporting arbitration) when the claim is directly related to a match, as was the case; thus, on 7 December, Internacional's chairman, Fernando Carvalho, made a request to lawyer Konflanz to withdraw the lawsuit, which he did on 9 December.

Four Brazilian Second Division first stage matches were refereed by Paulo José Danelon. These matches were not annulled.

Paulo José Danelon and Edílson Pereira de Carvalho, together, refereed 22 Paulista Championship matches. None of these matches has been annulled, including two of them which were initially considered suspected of being fixed. Both suspected matches were refereed by Paulo José Danelon. The São Paulo Football Sporting Justice Court's Inquiry Court, after analyzing all the 22 matches, concluded that no matches were fixed, with the exception of the two suspected matches. Even after coming to the conclusion that these two matches were fixed, the São Paulo Football Sporting Justice Court decided that the results should be kept.

Edílson Pereira de Carvalho was banned for life by the STJD's First Disciplinary Commission. Paulo José Danelon was removed from the referee staff of Paulista Football Federation. On 31 October 2005, the São Paulo Football Sporting Justice Court's First Disciplinary Commission banned for life both Edilson Pereira de Carvalho and Paulo José Danelon. So, they are prohibited from refereeing Paulista football competitions matches. Both Edílson Pereira de Carvalho and Paulo José Danelon face charges of fraud, conspiracy and crimes against the economy. The entrepreneur Nagib Fayad (nicknamed Gibão), suspected of commanding the gambling ring in Piracicaba was arrested on 25 September.

Brazilian National Championship Matches annulled by STJD

Brazilian Second Division matches refereed by Danelon

Suspected Paulista Championship matches

See also
 Golden Whistle: Portuguese football corruption scandal
 2005 Bundesliga scandal in Germany
 2006 Serie A scandal in Italy
 2011 Turkish sports corruption scandal

References

External links
Sports Illustrated news
The Star Online
Veja magazine report (in Portuguese)
Brazilian Yahoo News (in Portuguese) (Link dead as of 05:29, January 15, 2007 (UTC))
Terra Esportes coverage (in Portuguese)
No Olhar (in Portuguese)

2005 in Brazilian football
Brazilian football scandal
Association football controversies